Mary-Dell Chilton (born February 2, 1939, in Indianapolis, Indiana) is one of the founders of modern plant biotechnology.

Early life and education
Chilton attended private school for her early education.  She earned both a B.S. and Ph.D. in chemistry from the University of Illinois Urbana-Champaign. She later completed postdoctoral work at the University of Washington at Seattle

Career and research
Chilton taught and performed research at Washington University in St. Louis. While on faculty there in the late 1970s and early 1980s, she led a collaborative research study that produced the first transgenic plants.

Chilton was the first (1977) to demonstrate the presence of a fragment of Agrobacterium Ti plasmid DNA in the nuclear DNA of crown gall tissue. Her research on Agrobacterium also showed that the genes responsible for causing disease could be removed from the bacterium without adversely affecting its ability to insert its own DNA into plant cells and modify the plant's genome. Chilton described what she had done as disarming the bacterial plasmid responsible for the DNA transfer. She and her collaborators produced the first genetically modified plants using Agrobacterium carrying the disarmed Ti plasmid (1983). She has been called the "queen of Agrobacterium."

Chilton is author of more than 100 scientific publications. She is a Distinguished Science Fellow at Syngenta Biotechnology, Inc. She began her corporate career in 1983 with CIBA-Geigy Corporation (a legacy company of Syngenta).

Awards and honors
For her work with Agrobacterium tumefaciens, she has been recognized with an honorary doctorate from the University of Louvaine, the John Scott Medal from the City of Philadelphia, membership in the United States National Academy of Sciences, and the Benjamin Franklin Medal in Life Sciences from the Franklin Institute.

She was honored by the Crop Science Society of America in 2011 with the organization's Presidential Award.

In honor of her many achievements, in 2002 Syngenta announced creation of the Mary-Dell Chilton Center – a new administrative and conference center which was added to the company's facility in Research Triangle Park, in North Carolina.

In June 2013, she was named a laureate of the prestigious 2013 World Food Prize.

In 2015, Chilton was elected to the National Inventors Hall of Fame. In 2020, she was one of eight women featured in "The Only One in the Room" display at the Smithsonian National Museum of American History.

Chilton has been recognized as a Pioneer Member of the American Society of Plant Biologists.

References

External links 
 Mary-Dell Chilton at Syngenta
 Guide to the Mary-Dell Chilton Papers 1947-1999

1939 births
Living people
People from Indianapolis
University of Illinois Urbana-Champaign alumni
Members of the United States National Academy of Sciences
20th-century American women scientists
20th-century American scientists
21st-century American biologists
Agriculture and food award winners
21st-century American women scientists
Washington University in St. Louis faculty